This is a list of islands of Sweden. According to 2013 statistics report there are in total 267,570 islands in Sweden, fewer than 1000 of which are inhabited. Their total area is 1.2 million hectares, which corresponds to 3 percent of the total land area of Sweden.

Rough population statistics are from 2015.

Ordered by size

Other well-known islands 

Adelsö
Björkö (Birka)
Frösön
Gåsö
Gotska Sandön
Helgö
Holmöarna
Koster Islands
Lidingö
Märket
Mjältön
Stora Karlsö
Ven
Visingsö
Furusund

See also 
List of islands of Bothnian Bay
List of islands of Stockholm
List of lighthouses and lightvessels in Sweden
List of islands in the Baltic Sea
List of islands

References 

Sweden, List of islands of
Islands